Weibull is a Swedish locational surname. The Weibull family share the same roots as the Danish / Norwegian noble family of Falsen. They originated from and were named after the village of Weiböl in Widstedts parish, Jutland, but settled in Skåne, Sweden in the 17th century. The surname Weibull may refer to:

Curt Weibull (1886–1991), Swedish historian
Lauritz Weibull (1873–1960), Swedish historian
Marie Weibull Kornias (born 1954), Swedish politician
Waloddi Weibull (1887–1979), Swedish scientist and mathematician

Other uses
A number of statistical concepts are named after Waloddi Weibull:
Exponentiated Weibull distribution
Poly-Weibull distribution
Q-Weibull distribution
Weibull distribution
Weibull fading
Weibull modulus

References

Swedish-language surnames
Swedish families